Eukaryotic translation initiation factor 3 subunit L (eIF3l), less commonly known as EIF3EIP, is a protein that in humans is encoded by the EIF3L gene.

Interactions 

eIF3l has been shown to interact with eIF3a.

See also 
Eukaryotic initiation factor 3 (eIF3)

References

Further reading